Kießling is a German topographic surname, which originally meant a resident of an area of gravelly land, from the Middle High German kiselinc ("gravel"). An alternative meaning is as a locational surname for a person from one of the places called Kießling in Germany. Spelling variants include Kiessling and Kiesling. The name may refer to:

Adolf Kiessling (1837–1893), German classical philologist
Ann Kiessling (born 1942), American biologist
Brady Kiesling (born 1957), American diplomat
Georg Kießling (1903–1964), German football player
Günter Kießling, (1925–2009) German general
Heinrich Kiesling (1909–1944), German colonel
Heinz Kiessling (1926–2003), German musician
Karl Johann Kiessling (1839–1905), German physicist
Laura L. Kiessling (born 1961), American chemist
Michael Kiesling (born 1957), German board game designer
Michael Kießling (born 1973), German politician
Rebecca Kiessling (born 1969), American activist
Scott Kiesling (born 1967), American linguist
Stefan Kießling (born 1984), German football player
Udo Kiessling (born 1955), German ice hockey player
Walt Kiesling (1903–1962), American football player and coach

See also
Kisling
Kissling

References

German toponymic surnames

German-language surnames
Surnames of German origin

de:Kießling